Renan Guilherme Wagner (born 19 December 1991) is a Brazilian footballer who plays as a midfielder for Metropolitano.

Wagner also holds German passport.

Career

Youth career
Born in Blumenau, Santa Catarina state, Wagner started his career at Rio de Janeiro team Campo Grande. Through agent Pedrinho VRP, he arrived Italy along with Felipe Chalegre and Diego Tolentino. He played for Vicenza's Primavera under-20 team in 2007–08 season. He moved to Internazionale Primavera in 2008. Inter signed him along with Jean Mbida. In exchange, Nicolas Giani, Ivan Fatić (loan), youngster Ivan Reali (loan) and Renato Ricci (loan) joined Vicenza. However, in January 2009 he returned to the city of Vicenza.

On 31 August 2010, he joined the fellow Serie B team Varese.

Senior career
On 2 August 2011 he left for Foggia.

On 1 July 2013 Wagner returned to Varese and was awarded no.25 shirt. However, in the same summer, he left for Triestina.

References

External links
 
 

1991 births
Living people
People from Blumenau
Brazilian footballers
Brazilian people of German descent
Brazilian expatriate footballers
S.S.D. Varese Calcio players
Calcio Foggia 1920 players
S.F. Aversa Normanna players
S.S. Ischia Isolaverde players
Virtus Entella players
U.S. Triestina Calcio 1918 players
Clube Atlético Metropolitano players
Karlstad BK players
A.C. Tuttocuoio 1957 San Miniato players
Serie C players
Serie D players
Campeonato Brasileiro Série D players
Association football midfielders
Expatriate footballers in Italy
Expatriate footballers in Sweden
Brazilian expatriate sportspeople in Italy
Brazilian expatriate sportspeople in Sweden
Sportspeople from Santa Catarina (state)